The Commonline Journal is a literary e-journal of accessible poetry and discourse. The journal gained its initial reputation by publishing realist poetry from writers emerging through Web 2.0 mediums and turn of the century hyperzines. The journal published many forms of writing and declared a proclivity for "low to medium-diction free-verse poetry that is dramatic, graphic and succinct."

Originally called "The Commonline Project", the e-journal was first developed at The Evergreen State College as an interdisciplinary curriculum in literary theory. The journal published its final issue in 2017.

The journal featured regular contributions from several Literary Editors including the poets Justin Hyde, Dennis Paul Wilken, Rob Plath, and  Luis Cuauhtémoc Berriozábal. Notable contributors to The Commonline Journal include writers James Robison, Tony O'Neill, Suzanne Buffam, Rebecca Wolff, Ellen Bass, Lyn Lifshin, National Poetry Slam champion Anis Mojgani and Pulitzer Prize winner Stephen Dunn.

References

External links
 

2007 establishments in Washington (state)
English-language magazines
Evergreen State College
Magazines established in 2007
Magazines published in Seattle
Online literary magazines published in the United States
Poetry magazines published in the United States
Quarterly magazines published in the United States